No htamin (also known in English as milk rice) is a festive rice dish in Burmese cuisine, typically associated with celebratory occasions and generally regarded for its restorative properties.

Buttered rice uses long-grained paw hsan hmwe or basmati rice, and is cooked with milk, shallots, butter, salt, and optionally with spices such as garam masala, cumin and aniseed. It is typically eaten with Burmese curries.

See also
 List of rice dishes

References

Burmese cuisine
Foods featuring butter
Rice dishes